Kimiko Date and Ai Sugiyama were the defending champions but only Sugiyama competed that year with Shinobu Asagoe.

Asagoe and Sugiyama lost in the semifinals to Kerry-Anne Guse and Corina Morariu.

Alexia Dechaume-Balleret and Rika Hiraki won in the final 6–4, 6–2 against Guse and Morariu.

Seeds
Champion seeds are indicated in bold text while text in italics indicates the round in which those seeds were eliminated.

 Naoko Kijimuta /  Nana Miyagi (semifinals)
 Amy Frazier /  Kimberly Po (quarterfinals)
 Alexia Dechaume-Balleret /  Rika Hiraki (champions)
 Janet Lee /  Shi-Ting Wang (quarterfinals)

Draw

External links
 1997 Japan Open Tennis Championships Women's Doubles Draw

Doubles